Proisotoma minuta is a species of elongate-bodied springtail in the family Isotomidae. It is found in Europe. It has also been found in agricultural land in Manitoba, Canada. This species is a fungivore.

References

External links

 

Collembola
Articles created by Qbugbot
Animals described in 1871